Mill Woods Road, together with 38 Avenue NW, is a ring road in the neighbourhood of Mill Woods, Edmonton, Alberta, Canada. Although Mill Woods is bisected by a number of numbered arterials, Mill Woods has utilized a newer form of residential and street design by building this inner neighbourhood ring, which acts as a collector for the curved and named residential streets.

Neighbourhoods
List of neighbourhoods Mill Woods Road runs through, in counter-clockwise order:

Major intersections
This is a list of major intersections, starting at the west end of Mill Woods Road going counter-clockwise.

See also 

 Transportation in Edmonton

References

Roads in Edmonton